Lucas Sundberg Sims (born May 10, 1994) is an American professional baseball pitcher for the Cincinnati Reds of Major League Baseball (MLB). He previously played for the Atlanta Braves.

Career

Atlanta Braves
Sims was drafted by the Atlanta Braves in the first round of the 2012 Major League Baseball draft, 21st overall, out of Brookwood High School in Snellville, Georgia. He signed with the Braves, receiving a $1.65 million signing bonus.

During his first professional season he pitched for the rookie level Gulf Coast League Braves and Danville Braves. He finished 2–4 with a 3.71 earned run average with 39 strikeouts in 34 innings pitched.

Sims played the 2013 season with the Class-A Rome Braves. He started the season in the bullpen but was then moved to the rotation. He finished the season 12–4 with a 2.62 ERA and 134 strikeouts in  innings. In 2013, Sims was considered the Braves best prospect according to MLB.com.

In 2014 he was 8–11 with a 4.20 ERA in Class A+. He had fallen to third on the same list by the start of the 2015 season, and was placed seventh on the year-end list. Between three teams, he was 7–6 with a 4.37 ERA. The Braves sent Sims to the Arizona Fall League in 2015. He opened the AFL season for the Peoria Javelinas, and also started the Fall Stars Game.

Sims started 2016 as the Braves # 13 prospect according to Baseball America, and was invited to spring training for the first time. He began the season with the Mississippi Braves, and was promoted to Gwinnett on April 23. He struggled in the International League and returned to Mississippi on June 17. Sims finished 2016 with a 7–11 record and a 4.40 ERA; his 92 walks were the fourth-highest total in the minor leagues, and more than the total of any major leaguer. The Braves added him to their 40-man roster after the season.

Sims faced the Los Angeles Dodgers on August 1, 2017, in his major league debut. He pitched six innings, yielding three earned runs and recording three strikeouts. The debuts of Sims and Ozzie Albies marked the first time since 1968 that the Atlanta Braves started two players making their first major league appearance on the same day. He finished the season 3–6, with a 5.62 ERA. In December 2017, Braves manager Brian Snitker said that he might look at Max Fried, Sims, or another pitcher as the team's fifth starter in 2018. Sims spent time with the major league team in spring training, but began the 2018 season in Gwinnett.

Cincinnati Reds
On July 30, 2018, the Braves traded Sims, Matt Wisler, and Preston Tucker to the Cincinnati Reds in exchange for Adam Duvall.
Sims started his first game as a Red on May 28, 2019, against the Pittsburgh Pirates.

In 2020, Sims went 3–0 with a 2.45 ERA and 34 strikeouts in  innings over 20 games in relief. In 2021, he went 5–3 with a 4.40 ERA and 76 strikeouts in 47 innings.

Personal
Sims and his wife, Dani, married in 2017.

References

External links

1994 births
Living people
People from Lawrenceville, Georgia
Sportspeople from the Atlanta metropolitan area
Baseball players from Georgia (U.S. state)
Major League Baseball pitchers
Atlanta Braves players
Cincinnati Reds players
Gulf Coast Braves players
Danville Braves players
Rome Braves players
Lynchburg Hillcats players
Carolina Mudcats players
Mississippi Braves players
Peoria Javelinas players
Gwinnett Braves players
Gwinnett Stripers players
Louisville Bats players